Five Star Bank Plaza is a high-rise building located in Rochester, New York, United States, designed by Skidmore, Owings & Merrill. It is the sixth tallest building in Rochester and was originally built as Marine Midland Plaza. Site preparation work started December 1967, with groundbreaking on February 5, 1968. Tishman Realty & Construction, who built the Original World Trade Center Complex, were the builders. The building was renovated in 1999.

The iHeartMedia radio stations 95.1 WAIO, 100.5 WDVI, 1180 WHAM, 1280 WHTK, 107.3 WNBL, 106.7 WKGS and 102.3 WVOR broadcast from studios located on the 16th floor of the tower. Five Star Bank moved its regional headquarters to Rochester in 2016. Five Star Bank will lease three floors for ten years. Marine Midland was re-branded as HSBC in 1999 as part of HSBC's global re-branding, thus renaming the plaza One HSBC Plaza. HSBC Bank USA moved out of the plaza several years later. They sold the branch to First Niagara Bank in 2012 then later consolidated with another branch nearby. Five Star Bank opened a branch in the Plaza on the building's first floor, as had been done with each bank.

The building lights up certain offices with red lights to display a Christmas tree during the holiday season.  Large illuminated lettering bearing the name and logo of Five Star Bank was added to the top of the building when the building changed names to Five Star Bank Plaza (whose branch is respectively located at One Five Star Bank Plaza).

References

See also
List of tallest buildings in Rochester, New York

Skyscraper office buildings in Rochester, New York
1970 establishments in New York (state)
Office buildings completed in 1970
Skidmore, Owings & Merrill buildings